Willie James Wells (August 10, 1906 – January 22, 1989), nicknamed "The Devil," was an American baseball player. He was a shortstop who played from 1924 to 1948 for various teams in the Negro leagues and in Latin America.

Wells was a fast base-runner who hit for both power and average. He was at his finest with his glove, committing almost no errors and having the speed to run down anything that came in his direction. He is widely considered the best black shortstop of his day. He also taught Jackie Robinson how to turn a double play.

Wells was also notable as being the first player to use a batting helmet, after being hit and receiving a concussion while playing with the Newark Eagles (his first helmet was a construction helmet).

Wells is a member of the National Baseball Hall of Fame.

On February 5, 2022 the baseball field at Anderson High School (8403 Mesa Dr., Austin, TX 78759) was dedicated in Willie's honor.  The celebration included members of the Wells' family with the keynote presentation by Bob Kendrick, President of the Negro Leagues Baseball Museum.

Early life
Wells was born in Austin, Texas. He attended Anderson High School in Austin. He briefly attended Samuel Huston College in Austin before he was called up to the St. Louis team in the NNL.

Negro league career
After a short stint with the St. Louis Giants,  he entered the NNL with the St. Louis Stars in 1924, playing for the Stars through 1931, when both the team and league folded after the 1931 season. In 1926 he hit 27 home runs, a Negro leagues single-season record. In 1930, he led the Negro National League in home runs (seventeen), runs batted in (114), and batting average (.411) to win the batting Triple Crown; he was the fourth player to achieve the distinction. From 1932 to 1935 he played for the Chicago American Giants and played for the Newark Eagles from 1936 to 1939. While with the Eagles, Wells was part of the "Million Dollar Infield," consisting of Wells, Ray Dandridge, Dick Seay, and Mule Suttles.

He played in Mexico in 1940 and 1941, where he said he experienced democracy, acceptance and freedom. Wells was nicknamed El Diablo by Mexican fans for his extraordinary intensity and the English translation ("The Devil") followed him as a nickname in the United States. He returned to the Negro leagues in 1942 as a player-manager for the Eagles and then went back to Mexico for the 1943 and 1944 seasons.

Returning to the U.S. in 1945, Wells played for various Negro league teams through the 1950 season, including the Memphis Red Sox where he played alongside his son Willie Wells Jr. in 1948. He then went to Canada as a player-manager for the Winnipeg Buffaloes of the Western Canadian Leagues, remaining there until his retirement from playing baseball in 1954. Wells returned to the U.S. and continued with the sport as manager of the Birmingham Black Barons.

Later life and legacy
After his baseball career, Wells was employed at a New York City deli before returning to his birthplace of Austin to look after his mother. He died of congestive heart failure in Austin in 1989. Wells was originally buried in Evergreen Cemetery in Austin, Texas, but was re-interred in the Texas State Cemetery in Austin.

He has also been inducted into the Mexican Professional Baseball Hall of Fame and Cuban Baseball Hall of Fame.

Known statistics: .319 career batting average, .510 slugging percentage, 98 home runs, 644 runs scored, 399 runs batted in, and 756 games played.

Stella Lee Wells, Willie's daughter, created a scholarship fund honoring her father, called the Stella and Willie Wells Scholarship Fund.  The fund awards scholarships at Huston–Tillotson University in Austin, Texas.

See also
Disch Field

Notes

References

External links
 and Seamheads
  and Seamheads

1906 births
1989 deaths
African-American baseball managers
African-American baseball players
Alijadores de Tampico players
American expatriate baseball players in Canada
American expatriate baseball players in Mexico
Azules de Veracruz players
Baltimore Elite Giants players
Baseball players from Austin, Texas
Baseball shortstops
Birmingham Black Barons players
Brandon Greys players
Burials at Texas State Cemetery
Chicago American Giants players
Detroit Wolves players
Diablos Rojos del México players
Homestead Grays players
Huston–Tillotson Rams baseball players
Indianapolis Clowns players
Kansas City Monarchs players
Leopardos de Santa Clara players
Memphis Red Sox players
National Baseball Hall of Fame inductees
New York Black Yankees players
Newark Eagles players
Professional Basketball League of America players
St. Louis Stars (baseball) players
Winnipeg Buffaloes players
St. Louis Giants (1924) players
American expatriate baseball players in Cuba
20th-century African-American sportspeople